Liam Buchanan (born 27 March 1985) is a Scottish professional footballer who plays as a striker for Lowland Football League club Berwick Rangers. A product of the Hearts youth system, Buchanan made his breakthrough at Cowdenbeath. Having spent five years at the Fife club, he joined Scottish Football League First Division side Partick Thistle and subsequently Dunfermline Athletic. After spells in the lower divisions of Scottish football, Buchanan then joined Scottish League One side East Fife. After a successful time in Methil, he moved to Scottish Championship side Alloa Athletic in July 2014 before signing with Livingston a year later. He then joined Raith Rovers in 2017 and two years later returned for a second spell with Alloa.

Career
Born in Edinburgh, Buchanan made his breakthrough in football at Cowdenbeath, progressing through their youth system to play in the first team. Buchanan was prolific for the Central Park club, finishing top goalscorer in seasons 2005–06 and 2006–07.

Buchanan then signed for Partick Thistle at the start of the 2007–08 season. Buchanan was the Firhill club's top scorer that season, despite suffering a long-term injury early in 2008 and being out until October that same year, when he played in his return match against Airdrie United. Buchanan predominantly played in the number 9 shirt and was thought to be the next big prospect at the club. Buchanan notched 14 goals in that first season, from 27 starts and three substitute appearances.

In January 2011, Buchanan signed for Dunfermline Athletic. Buchanan helped the club win the 2010–11 Scottish First Division that gained promotion to the Scottish Premier League. The club finished bottom of the table in the 2011–12 Scottish Premier League season and were automatically relegated into the Scottish Football League First Division.

In August 2012, it was confirmed that Buchanan had rejected a new contract with Dunfermline and signed for Sligo Rovers. On 7 December 2012, Buchanan signed for Airdrie United. Buchanan left Airdrie on 10 January 2013 and then signed for Ayr United until the end of the 2012–13 season.

On 26 July 2013, Buchanan signed for East Fife. After one season there, he signed for Alloa. Buchanan then spent two seasons with Livingston, where the club were relegated and subsequently promoted the next season to the Scottish Championship. Buchanan, however, remained in Scottish League One, signing for recently relegated club Raith Rovers on 9 June 2017.

On 7 June 2019, Buchanan signed for Alloa Athletic for a second time.

On the 22nd of June 2022, Buchanan signed for Berwick Rangers of the Lowland Football League.

Personal life
Buchanan's father, George, was jailed for five years in 2011 after being convicted of running a heroin-dealing operation in Edinburgh.

Career statistics

Honours

Club
Dunfermline Athletic
 Scottish First Division: 2010–11

Sligo Rovers
 League of Ireland Premier Division: 2012

Livingston
Scottish League One: 2016–17

Individual
Scottish Football League Young Player of the Month: December 2006
PFA Scotland Scottish Second Division Team of the Year: 2006–07
Scottish League One Player of the Month: October 2016
PFA Scotland Scottish League One Team of the Year: 2016–17
PFA Scotland Scottish League One Player of the Year: 2016–17

References

External links
 

Living people
Scottish footballers
Footballers from Edinburgh
1985 births
Cowdenbeath F.C. players
Dunfermline Athletic F.C. players
Partick Thistle F.C. players
Scottish Football League players
Association football forwards
Heart of Midlothian F.C. players
East Fife F.C. players
Berwick Rangers F.C. players
Scottish Premier League players
Lowland Football League players
Sligo Rovers F.C. players
League of Ireland players
Scottish Professional Football League players
Alloa Athletic F.C. players
Ayr United F.C. players
Livingston F.C. players
Airdrieonians F.C. players
Raith Rovers F.C. players